Ad. Ermera or Associação Desportiva Ermera is a football club of East Timor come from Ermera. The team plays in the Taça Digicel.

References

Football clubs in East Timor
Football
Ermera Municipality
Association football clubs established in 2010
2010 establishments in East Timor